Boderne is a small village on the south-eastern coast on the island of Bornholm in Denmark. It is located approximately 5 km south of Aakirkeby.

References 

Bornholm
Cities and towns in the Capital Region of Denmark